Wasted Youth may refer to:
 Wasted Youth (American band), a 1980s hardcore punk band
 Wasted Youth (British band), a 1980s goth post-punk band
 Wasted Youth (film), a 2011 Greek film
 Wasted Youth (magazine), a Canadian teen punk rock magazine
 Wasted Youth (For the Fallen Dreams album)
 Wasted Youth (Girl album)
 "Wasted Youth", a 1993 spoken-word piece performed by Jim Steinman on Bat Out of Hell II: Back into Hell